É Proibido Fumar (English: Smoke Gets in Your Eyes) is a 2009 Brazilian film written and directed by Anna Muylaert. It stars Glória Pires and Paulo Miklos.

Cast 
Glória Pires	...	Baby 
Paulo Miklos	...	Max
Alessandra Colassanti	...	Stellinha 
Dani Nefussi	...	Teca
Marisa Orth	...	Pop
Paula Pretta	...	Vanilda
Henrique Silveira	...	Lito
Lili Angel	...	Dona Guida
Antônio Edson	...	Seu Chico 
Antonio Abujamra	...	Pepe
Lourenço Mutarelli	...	Corretor
Pitty	...	Mikaela - Cliente Corretor
Lucas Machado Candeias	...	Paulinho
Emerson Danesi	...	Suzuki
Roberto Andreoli	...	Johnny Marley

Awards 
2009: Brasília Film Festival 
Best Film (won)
Best Actor (Paulo Miklos) (won)
Best Actress (Glória Pires) (won)
Best Supporting Actress (Dani Nefussi) (won) 
Best Art Direction (Ana Mara Abreu) (won) 
Best Editing (Paulo Sacramento) (won) 
Best Music (Marcio Nigro) (won) 
Best Screenplay (Anna Muylaert) (won)

2010: Cinema Brazil Grand Prize 
Best Picture (won)
Best Director (Anna Muylaert) (won)  
Best Screenplay, Original (Anna Muylaert) (won)  
Best Editing - Fiction (Paulo Sacramento) (won)  
Best Music (Marcio Nigro) (won)

2010: São Paulo Association of Art Critics Awards
Best Actress (Glória Pires) (won)  
Best Director (Anna Muylaert) (won)

References

External links 
 

2009 films
2000s Portuguese-language films
2009 romantic drama films
Brazilian romantic drama films